A joint civil-military operations task force, or JCMOTF, is a task organized military unit with the functional purpose of conducting civil-military operations.  A JCMOTF generally contains civil affairs type forces with specialists in areas such as nation building, humanitarian assistance, public works and utilities, public safety and health, public education, governance and economics.  A military commander may form a JCMOTF during war or disaster relief to stabilize and rebuild an area.  A commander may also employ a JCMOTF during peace to perform humanitarian or nation assistance.  A JCMOTF may also contain civilian governance, development or stabilization specialists.

Footnotes

Civil affairs
Civil affairs units and formations of the United States